Abborrträsk is a small lake in Stockholm County, Sweden.  It lies within the Abborrträsk Nature Reserve.

The lake is surrounded by steep rock walls, but there is access to the water at the southern end. Bathing in the lake is possible although there is no official bathing place.  Fishing in the lake with a line or rod is permitted and does not require a permit.

References

Lakes of Stockholm County